Spümcø, Inc. is an American animation production company based in Los Angeles, California. The studio produced three traditionally animated series, two Flash-animated cartoon series, two music videos, five animated shorts, and a comic book. The company also went on to produce content for several animated spots and commercials. It has won several awards, including an Annie Award for Best Animated Short Subject, for the Björk music video, "I Miss You".

On August 11, 1991, The Ren and Stimpy Show premiered on Nickelodeon, and the show would be produced and animated by Spümcø Inc. After creator John Kricfalusi was fired in September 1992, Games Animation took over production after season two had ended, and would continue production for the next three seasons. In 2001, 10 years after The Ren and Stimpy Show had premiered, Kricfalusi then created an animated series for Fox Kids in the United States and Teletoon in Canada, The Ripping Friends. The series premiered on September 22, 2001, and would last for only one season. In 2002, when Kricfalusi received a phone call from Spike (now Paramount Network), he decided to revive Ren & Stimpy in the more adult-oriented series, Ren & Stimpy "Adult Party Cartoon". The series premiered on June 1, 2003, with the banned Nickelodeon series' episode, "Man's Best Friend", and a total of three original episodes aired on Spike. The show was cancelled in July 2003, one month after it premiered.

During 1997, John Kricfalusi and his staff at Spümcø launched their web site, which aimed to deliver cartoons to audiences without television networks' censorship. Kricfalusi decided to use George Liquor, a cartoon character he created, to star in the Flash Internet cartoon series, The Goddamn George Liquor Program, which Kricfalusi created. The series premiered on October 15, 1997, and was the first cartoon series to be produced exclusively for the Internet. In 1999, Spümcø created their second Internet-only cartoon series, Weekend Pussy Hunt. The series would last for 12 episodes, with 4 unfinished cartoons due to budget problems.

In 1999, Spümcø produced and animated a Yogi Bear TV special titled Boo Boo Runs Wild, which premiered on September 24, 1999, on Cartoon Network. The animated short focused on Yogi Bear's sidekick, Boo Boo Bear, who becomes fed up with the rules of man and decides to return to his natural bear roots. Though it focused primarily on Yogi and Boo Boo, it was titled as a "Ranger Smith cartoon." Alongside Boo Boo Runs Wild, a second "Ranger Smith" cartoon aired, titled A Day in the Life of Ranger Smith. Between 2001 and 2002, two Flash-animated Jetsons cartoons were created exclusively for Cartoon Network's official web site: The Jetsons: Father & Son Day and The Jetsons: The Best Son. A third Yogi Bear cartoon, titled Boo Boo and the Man, premiered in 2002 on Cartoon Network's official web site. It was animated in Macromedia Flash.

In 1997, John Kricfalusi directed a music video for Björk titled "I Miss You", a single that was released the same year. It was animated by the entire staff at Spümcø. It premiered on MTV, as well as Canada's MuchMusic channel. In 2001, Spümcø produced their second music video production for Tenacious D, "Fuck Her Gently". The video was produced in Macromedia Flash, and was directed by Gabe Swarr, who was also a producer for The Goddamn George Liquor Program and Weekend Pussy Hunt.

Although the company originally closed down in 2005 due to a lawsuit with Carbunkle Cartoons (one of the animators on Ren & Stimpy), it was revealed in 2016 on Tumblr that Kricfalusi and Cartoon Network storyboard artist Gabe Del Valle are reopening the company, under the name Spümtwø, to produce bigger projects and are now looking for employees. The new studio's first project was stated to be a Ren and Stimpy short film slated to appear in front of The SpongeBob Movie: Sponge on the Run, with the possibility of reviving the series. John Kricfalusi denied it in a February 2017 Twitter post. However, an animatic of the short was released as an Easter egg on the Cans without Labels DVD in May 2019.

Animation productions

Televised animated series

Internet-exclusive series and shorts

Cartoon Network short films

Feature films

Music videos

Television and online commercials

Video games

Unrealized projects

References

External links
Spümcø's Wonderful World of Cartoons! at the Internet Archive
Spümcø at the Internet Movie Database
ASIFA-Hollywood: The International Animated Film Society
Spümcø at the ASIFA-Hollywood Animation Archive

Spümcø
Lists of animation